Susanne Hannestad is a Norwegian handball player. She played 43 matches for the Norwegian national team between 1979 and 1983.  She participated at the 1982 World Women's Handball Championship, where the Norwegian team placed seventh.

References

Year of birth missing (living people)
Living people
Norwegian female handball players
20th-century Norwegian women